Isak Jönsson (born 11 January 1999) is a Swedish footballer who plays for Trelleborgs FF.

Career
Jönsson grew up in Skurup and started playing football in Skurups AIF. At the age of 15-year, he went to BK Olympic and already after a year, Jönsson was promoted to the first team.

References

External links 
 

Swedish footballers
1999 births
Living people
Superettan players
Allsvenskan players
BK Olympic players
Trelleborgs FF players
Association football defenders